Chrysozephyrus paona, the Paona hairstreak, is a small butterfly found in India that belongs to the lycaenids or blues family.

Taxonomy
The butterfly was previously classified as Thecla paona Moore.

Range
The butterfly occurs in India in Manipur.

Status
In 1932 William Harry Evans described the species as very rare.

See also
List of butterflies of India (Lycaenidae)

Cited references

References
  
 
 

Chrysozephyrus
Butterflies of Asia